Anna Christina Witmond-Berkhout (18701899) was a Dutch children's writer, best known under her pseudonym Tine van Berken. She also wrote adult books under the name Anna Koubert.

Life
Tine van Berken was born on September 29, 1870 in Amsterdam. Between 1894 and 1899 she wrote a large number of books for girls.

In 1899 she founded the journal Lente: Weekblad voor jonge dames [Spring: Young Ladies' Weekly Magazine]. She corresponded with Top Naeff about placing an article in Spring, and read Naeff's novel Schoolidyllen [School Idylls]. However, she died from tuberculosis on December 7, 1899.

The Flemish magic realist writer Johan Daisne wrote a biography of her, Tine van Berken of de intelligentie der ziel [Tine van Berken, or the intelligence of the soul] (1962).

Works

As Tine van Berken
 Een klaverblad van vier [A four-leaf clover], 1894
 De familie Berewoud [The Berewoud family], 1895
 Hans en Hanna [Hans and Hanna], 1896
 Meidorens: drie verhalen, 1896
 Mijn zusters en ik [My sisters and I], 1896
 (tr.) Mooie Bruno, 1896. Translated from the English Beautiful Joe by Margaret Marshall Saunders.
 Wilde wingerd: drie verhalen [Virginia creeper: three stories], 1896
 De dochters van den generaal [The daughters of the general], 1897
 Driftkopje: een verhaal, 1897
 Kleine menschen: drie verhalen [Little people: three stories], 1897
 Op kostschool en thuis [At boarding school and at home], 1897
 Rietje's pop [Rietje's doll], 1897
 Heintje Pochhans, 1898
 Kibbelaarstertje, 1898
 Lachebekje: een verhaal, 1898
 Regen en zonneschijn: drie verhalen [Rain and sunshine: three stories], 1898
 Kruidje-roer-me-niet, 1899
 De berewoudjes [The mountain forests], 1900
 Van een grootmoeder en zeven kleinkinderen [From a grandmother and seven grandchildren], 1900
 Robbedoes, 1905
 Rudi Willenborg, 1909
 Hedwigs St. Nicolaasfeest [Hedwig's Saint Nicholas feast], 1914
 Ons zonnetje: een verhaal [Our sunshine: a story], 1915

As Anna Koubert
 Nieuwe paneeltjes [New panels], Amsterdam, 1894
 Een scheepje zonder roer [A boat without a rudder], Amsterdam, 1895
 Confetti, Amsterdam, 1898
 Moeder Wassink [Mother Wassink], Amsterdam, 1900

References

External links
Berken, Tine van at Astro-Databank

1870 births
1899 deaths
Dutch children's writers
Dutch women children's writers
19th-century pseudonymous writers
Pseudonymous women writers
19th-century deaths from tuberculosis
Tuberculosis deaths in the Netherlands